Carl Laemmle Jr. (born Julius Laemmle; April 28, 1908 – September 24, 1979) was an American film producer - studio executive and heir of Carl Laemmle, who had founded Universal Studios. He was head of production at the studio from 1928 to 1936.

Early life

Laemmle was born on April 28, 1908, in Chicago, the son of Carl Laemmle, the founder of Universal Pictures, and Recha Stern Laemmle, who died in 1919 when he was eleven years old. Carl Jr. had a sister Rosabelle, and a cousin Carla, an actress and dancer. His mother was buried in Salem Fields Cemetery, Glendale, New York. His family was Jewish, and during the 1930s Carl Laemmle Sr. assisted Jewish people in leaving Germany.

The Laemmle family shared a large New York City apartment located at 465 West End Avenue before moving to Los Angeles, California.

Career

During his tenure as head of production, beginning in 1928 in the early years of talkie movies, the studio had great success with films such as All Quiet on the Western Front (1930), Dracula (1931), Waterloo Bridge (1931), Frankenstein (1931), East of Borneo (1931), A House Divided (1931), The Mummy (1932), The Old Dark House (1932), The Invisible Man (1933), Imitation of Life (1934), and Bride of Frankenstein (1935).

Laemmle (often referred to as "Junior") developed a reputation in this period for spending too much money on films that did not earn back their cost. By the end of 1935, Universal Studio had spent so much money, and had so many flops, that J. Cheever Cowdin offered to buy the Laemmles out. The notable success, both financially and critically, of the 1936 film Show Boat, was not enough to stem the downslide, and father and son were both forced out of the company. Neither worked on another film again, although Laemmle Jr. lived for 43 more years. Charles R. Rogers became the new head of production at the studio.

Personal life
Laemmle resided at 1641 Tower Grove Drive in Beverly Hills, California. He died from a stroke at the age of 71 on September 24, 1979, 40 years to the day of his father's death. He was buried in the Chapel Mausoleum at Home of Peace Cemetery.

Filmography

References

External links

Official Laemmle Family YouTube Channel
Official Laemmle family website

Carl Laemmle Jr., Virtual History

1908 births
1979 deaths
20th-century American Jews
People from Beverly Hills, California
American people of German-Jewish descent
20th-century American businesspeople
Burials at Home of Peace Cemetery
Film producers from Illinois
People from Chicago